The Lightweight Boat Races are a series of annual rowing races between men's and women's lightweight crews representing the University of Oxford and the University of Cambridge.

The first men's race took place in 1975, being joined by the women's race in 1984.  Both races are currently held on the 4.2-mile (6.8 km) Championship Course from Putney to Mortlake, although they previously formed part of the Henley Boat Races, along with various other rowing races between the two universities, including the openweight women's Boat Race.  Members of both teams are traditionally known as blues or half blues and each boat as a Blue Boat.  Competitors at the events have gone on to compete at international and Olympic levels.

History
Richard Bates, a Cambridge undergraduate, organised a Boat Race between lightweight men's crews of Oxford and Cambridge universities in 1975, to take place at Henley-on-Thames. The race was joined by the openweight women's Boat Race two years later, thus forming the Henley Boat Races, and the first lightweight women's boat race took place at the same event in 1984.  Reserve races have taken place on-and-off since 2000 for the lightweight men (Nephthys vs Granta) and since 2012 for the lightweight women (Tethys vs CUWBC Lightweight Reserves).

In 2019, the lightweight men's race moved to the Championship Course from Putney to Mortlake, where it has been held since.  The lightweight women's race made the same move the following year in 2020.

For the men's race the average weight of the crew must be 70 kg (154.3 lb / 11 st 0.3 lb), with no rower weighing over 72.5 kg (159.8 lb / 11 st 5.8 lb). For the women's race no rower can exceed 59 kg (130.0 lb / 9 st 4 lb).

The races receive annual press coverage, and competitors from both Universities have gone on to compete at international and Olympic levels.

Results
The history of the results of the races are as follows.

Lightweight Men's Boat Race
Cambridge: 30 wins
Oxford: 19 wins

Lightweight Women's Boat Race
Cambridge: 23 wins
Oxford: 17 wins

Lightweight Men's Reserves (Nephthys vs Granta)

Oxford: 12 wins
Cambridge: 5 wins

Lightweight Women's Reserves (Tethys vs CUBC Lightweight Women's Reserves) 
Cambridge: 4
Oxford: 2

Raced on the Friday before the main event in a 4+ in 2012, and incorporated into main race day in 2016.

See also
The Boat Race
Henley Boat Races

References

External links
Official website

Rowing at the University of Oxford
Rowing at the University of Cambridge
Recurring sporting events established in 1975
Rowing in the United Kingdom
Annual sporting events in the United Kingdom
Annual events in England
1975 establishments in England